Shihor libnath (šîḥôr liḇnāṯ) is a town mentioned in the Hebrew Bible/Old Testament that marked the boundary of Asher's tribal inheritance (Joshua 19:26).  Although the location of this town is unknown, the description in the Book of Joshua indicates that Shihor libnath marked Asher's western periphery in proximity to Mount Carmel.

Hebrew Bible cities